Development Counsellors International, also known as DCI, is a place marketing firm based in New York City that specializes in economic development and travel marketing, as well as investment lead generation services. Founded in 1960 by Ted Levine, the company now employs more than 60 people and has regional offices in Denver, Toronto and Los Angeles.

Since its founding, DCI has worked with more than 500 cities, regions, states, provinces and countries, helping them attract both investors and visitors in order to better the lives of people in their local communities. The firm's clients include large economic development organizations, chambers of commerce, and community and destination marketing organizations with a focus on economic development and tourism marketing.

DCI is proud to be a purpose-driven agency that holds its employees to its six values specific to the company’s role in marketing places.

History 
According to the company founder, DCI began with just one client and two employees. The company's first office consisted of two small rooms in a medical supply warehouse on 14th Street and 5th Avenue in Manhattan. As the U.S. director of public relations for Puerto Rico's Operation Bootstrap program, Ted Levine created a model economic development program for other countries wanting to boost tourism or encourage business development.

Andy Levine, son of Ted Levine, joined DCI in 1991 and has grown to become the firm’s chairman today. The agency’s day to day management is headed by an all-female team and hiring efforts focus on attracting diverse marketing professionals from around the world.

The company's use of an open-book management philosophy has led to unique monthly staff meetings, where employees, including administrative staffers, present the company's financial report for the previous month.  To give every employee a financial stake in the outcome, when a certain profit is accrued, a "win" is declared and 30 percent of the profit is distributed across the company, based upon a formula derived from each staff member's base salary during the "win" period.

DCI acquired Mondotels in 2010, creating DCI's meetings and incentive (MICE) division. Founded in 1982, Mondotels specialized in developing meeting and incentive business for destination marketing organizations and convention bureaus. Today, DCI continues to help destinations position themselves favorably to attract meeting and conference planners.

In October 2012, DCI released the first 40 Under 40 Awards, a biennial competition to find rising stars under 40 years old who have achieved success in the Economic Development industry. Chosen from submitted nominations by a team of industry thought leaders, past winners have proven success records of influencing the economic development of their regions.

Evolving with the times, DCI added a full service digital team to its agency in 2018.

Having helped navigate its destination clients through the 2020 COVID-19 pandemic, DCI identified and acted on shifting workplace dynamics, including remote working and second tier cities. With so many destinations looking to attract workers, DCI officially launched its talent attraction practice in 2022. The agency affirms that this formalized service sector was a natural progression, with talent attraction falling at the intersection of both its economic development and tourism marketing efforts.

Today the agency continues to prosper, and its leadership team continues to share their professional expertise at major conferences like the International Economic Development Council and Destinations International.

Awards & Rankings 

Outside Magazine choose DCI as one of the "100 Top Places to Work" in 2014 and 2016.

According to O’Dwyers, in 2016 DCI was ranked as America's fourth largest tourism and economic development marketing firm based on net fees  and 42nd largest overall in fees of major independent US public relations firms.

The company received PR News’ Community Relations award in 2006 for its efforts to help the Baton Rouge community recover from the effects of hurricane Katrina.

DCI received an Adrian Platinum Award in 2015 alongside MCA Namibia/Namibia Tourism Board. In 2016, the agency also received the Adrian Best In Show in partnership with the Huntington Beach Big Board Campaign by building and launching the world’s largest surfboard.

In 2016, DCI received a Bronze Anvil Award of Commendation from the Public Relations Society of America for their media relations work on behalf of the city of Salinas, California.

Forbes ranked DCI as one of America’s Best PR Agencies in 2021.

The Diversity Action Alliance awarded DCI 2022 Best Internal DEI Initiative in the boutique agency category for championing equity and inclusion.

Research & Reports 
DCI often conducts research and releases studies that provide insight into economic development and tourism marketing trends.

Economic Development Research

The Tweet Elite: 25 Mayors Who Have Mastered Twitter- By looking at the mayors of the 250 largest cities in America and ranking them in five important categories of Twitter usage (audience, frequency of tweets, responsiveness, engagement and influence), DCI developed a list the top 25 mayors in America who understand how to communicate in 140 characters or less. Released in 2016 as a part of DCI's quarterly Q Report series.

Best Locations for FDI- DCI's surveyed tax advisors who frequently consult with clients on international location decisions. With the data, the firm then gauged current and changing trends in foreign direct investment (FDI). Released in 2016 as a part of DCI's quarterly Q Report series

Winning Strategies in Economic Development- Released every three years since 1996 (most recently in 2020), the report analyzes what influences North American meeting planners and best practices for influencing their global site selection decisions. It includes the most effective marketing techniques in economic development and executive perceptions of the best business climates in the United States and the world.

A View from the Lower 48- Analyzed survey results reveal perceptions of U.S. executives and site selectors of Canada's business climate. The findings revealed that when compared to Canada, the United States is rated more favorably on numerous factors that are important to site location decisions. Released in December 2013.

Better Together: How Tourism and Economic Development Organizations Can Collaborate to Attract Visitors, Business and Talent: This 2019 study summarized responses from an online survey of 69 economic development organizations and 80 destination marketing organizations on the perceived challenges and opportunities with working with their EDO/DMO counterparts.

Tourism Research

Winning Strategies in Destination Marketing- This report examines at the decision making processes of the meeting industry's "customers," the study reveals and examines best practices in marketing places. Released in October 2015.

A View from Digital Influencers in the Era of COVID-19: While many influencers lost work during the pandemic, others looked at ways to adapt to the new reality. DCI conducted a survey of digital travel influencers to find out how their work was affected. This 2020 report is a concise summary of these findings that helped guide the path to working with influencers during recovery efforts.

Capturing the Canadian Consumer: Begun in 2018, this study dove into the travel preferences and behaviors of affluent Canadian travelers, a segment with historically limited research. It also delineates some differences between predominantly French-speaking and English-speaking consumers.

A DMO Deep Dive into Social Media: Budgets, Challenges and Staffing- From awareness generation to on the ground communication, destination marketing organizations (DMOs) are rapidly deploying social media campaigns. This research reveals how destinations structure and deploy their budget and staff to tackle social media challenges

Exploring the Generational Preferences of European Meeting Planners- In 2014, DCI and IACC partnered with the IMEX Group to develop a follow up study to the 2013 edition to explore the purchasing habits of meeting planners in Europe across multiple generations. The study's results were launched at IMEX Frankfurt in May 2014.

Exploring the Generational Preferences of North American Meeting Planners - In 2013, DCI and IACC's Emerging Trends Committee conducted a survey exploring the generational preferences of meeting planners. The study revealed differences in the key criteria that each generation of meeting planner considers relevant when selecting a destination and conference facility.

A New View: Travel Advisors Looking Beyond COVID-19: This report followed up DCI’s March 2020 (SOURCE) study on travel advisors with another round of surveys in May. It interrogated travel trade workers in the U.S. and Canada to find out how they managed their work as COVID-19 eased its grip on the travel industry.

Pandemic Recovery: A View from Travel Media: In partnership with SATW (Society of American Travel Writers), DCI explored how travel journalists and public relations professionals were faring following the global pandemic in 2022. The report built on preview studies, COVID-19: A View from Media (SOURCE) and COVID-19: A View From Travel PR (SOURCE)

A View from Meeting Planners; Winning Strategies in Destination Marketing: Since 2012, DCI’s Winning Strategies in Destination Marketing research which is released every three years looks specifically at meeting planners. The study revealed how decision makers form perceptions of destinations and outlines the best marketing and sales practices to attract business events.

Talent Attraction

How to Reel in Tomorrow’s Talent: As millennials and Gen Z become the largest generations in the workforce, companies and communities are turning their attention to attracting this talent to their regions. To gain a deeper insight into what influences career and location decisions for this rapidly growing workforce segment, DCI conducted a survey of 1,000+ individuals (ages 19-25) in 2018, to find out what interested them in seeking employment and what factors guided them.

Talent Wars: This annual report, begun in 2017, sets out to better understand how to attract, and ultimately retain, talent. It uncovers new trends and shifts in relation to travel and tourism, underscoring the importance of economic development and destination marketing organizations collaborating on talent attraction efforts.

External links 
 Visit the DCI Website

References 

Companies based in New York City